The Japan Dome Tour was the fourth concert tour in Japan and seventh overall by South Korean band Big Bang. The tour visited six of Japan's major concert domes, making BigBang the first foreign artists to headline their own six-dome tour. The tour was one of the country's highest-grossing concert tours of the year, and grossed over US$70.6 million from sixteen shows, with all of the tickets from the tour being sold out.

Concert

The concert kicked off with the Japanese version of BigBang's "Haru Haru", and the song was followed by "Blue", and "Bad Boy", and then BigBang's Japanese debut single, "Gara Gara Go". As the scale of the stadium is immense, BigBang used a flying stage that enables the entire stage to move, while also using a moving car that allows all five members to go closer to the fans. The three-hour-long concert encompassed more than 30 songs, including encore and re-encore.

Big Bang+α in Seoul
On November 28, 2013, two shows in Seoul were announced, under the name BigBang+α in Seoul. Both shows sold out within seconds after tickets were released, which led to a third show being added due to high demand.

Set list
This set list is representative of their first show in Saitama.

 "Haru Haru"
 "Blue"
 "Bad Boy"
 "Gara Gara Go!"
 "Hands Up"
 "Let's Talk About Love" 
 "Gotta Talk to You" 
 "What Can I Do" 
 "Wings" 
 "Joyful" 
 "Tell Me Goodbye"
 "Love Song"
 "La La La"
 "BIGBANG"
 "Shake It"
 "Only Look At Me" 
 "Wedding Dress" 
 "Ringa Linga" 
 "Crayon" 
 "Crooked" 
 "Turn It Up" 
 "Doom Dada" 
 "Tonight"
 "Feeling"
 "Last Farewell"
 "Fantastic Baby"
 "Lies"
 "My Heaven"
Encore
 "Sunset Glow"
 "Koe o Kikasete"
 "Fantastic Baby"
 "Feeling"
 "Bad Boy"

Tour dates

Personnel
Credits are adapted from BigBang's Japanese DVD BIGBANG JAPAN DOME TOUR 2013~2014.

Main
 Tour organizer: Avex Group, YG Entertainment
Executive producers – Yang Hyun-suk (YG Entertainment), Max Matsuura (Avex Group)

Tour producer – Ryoichi Eise 
Tour director – Jung Min Byun
Stage producer – "Joseph" Woo Ki Kwon 
Stylist – Yuni Choi, Kyung Mi Kim, Sharon Park
Hair – Tae Kyun Kim, Sang Hee Baek, So Yeon Lee
Make-up –  Yun Kyoung Kim, Mi Sug Shin, Jun Hee Lee

Visual director – Eun Gee (YG Entertainment)
Choreographers – Jae Wook Lee

Band
BigBang (G-Dragon, T.O.P, Taeyang, Daesung, Seungri) – Lead vocals
Gil Smith II (Music Director/Keyboard 1)
Omar Dominick (AMD/Bass)
Dante Jackson (Keyboard 2)
Justin Lyons (Guitar)
Bennie Rodgers II (Drums)
Adrian "AP" Porter (Pro Tools Programmer)

Dancers
 HI-TECH (Jung Heon Park, Young Sang Lee Sung Min Cho, Han Sol Lee, Byoung Gon Jung, Woo Ryun Jung, Young Deuk Kwon, Young Don Kwon)
 CRAZY (Jung Hee Kim, Ah Yeon Won, Eun Young Park, Min Jung Kim, Hee Yun Kim, Sae Bom Choi, Jung In Bae, Hye Jin Choi, Hyo Jung Bae, Ji Won Lee, Jae Hee Ryu, Ji Young Yoo)

References

External links
 Official website

2013 concert tours
2014 concert tours
BigBang (South Korean band) concert tours
Concert tours of Japan